Acraea encedana, the encedana acraea or Pierre's acraea, is a butterfly in the family Nymphalidae. It is found in Senegal, Gambia, Burkina Faso, Guinea, Sierra Leone, Liberia, Ivory Coast, Ghana, Benin, Nigeria, Angola, the Democratic Republic of the Congo, Sudan, Ethiopia, Kenya, Tanzania, Malawi, Zambia and Mozambique. The habitat consists of open areas near swampy ground.

Adults feed on the flowers of Tridax species.

The larvae feed on Desmodium salicifolium.

Mimicry 
A. encendana is a Müllerian mimic of another butterfly which occurs in Uganda, Danaus chrysippus.

Taxonomy
It is a member of the Acraea encedon species group.but see also Pierre & Bernaud, 2014

References

External links

Acraea encedana Le Site des Acraea de Dominique Bernaud
Acraea encedana Image collection Dominique Bernaud
Acraea encedana at Pteron

Butterflies described in 1976
encedana